Río Chira may refer to:

 Chira River, a river in northern Peru
 , a Norwegian motor vessel
 , a Peruvian Navy motor gunboat previously used by the United States Navy